Crematogaster pinicola is a species of ant in the genus crematogaster. It is commonly known as the Pine Tree Acrobat Ant.

The species name derives from pinus, meaning pine tree in Latin; and "cola", a Latin suffix meaning "dweller

References

Insects of the United States
Insects described in 2007